Oofotr (released 1995 by Norske Gram - Ekgcd 11) is a Norwegian studioalbum by the band Oofotr performing traditional music from Ofoten with a jazz influence.

Personnel 
Standard lineup
Ernst-Wiggo Sandbakk - drums and percussions
Jørn Øien - keyboards
Kjersti Stubø - vocals

Additional musicians
John Pål Inderberg alt saxophone
Tore Brunborg - tenor saxophone
Yngve Moe - bass guitar
Ove Bjørken - violin
Børge Petersen-Øverleir - guitar

Track listing 
«Hører du sangen...» (3:44), lyrics by Kjersti Stubø
«Alene Gud» (4:36)
«Sat i blomsten som en dronning» (2:10)
«Ofte I Trængsel og Motgangens Dage» (4:51)
«Hos Gud er Idel Glæde» (3:39), recorded live in "Kjeldebotn kirke"
«O Lam jeg Ser» (3:13)
«Astøingsvisa» (2:80)
«Ak mon min veg til kana'an» (4:14)
«Rypejægeren» (2:41)
«Pajeb Njuorajaure» (4:25), by Thorgeir Stubø
«Voggesang» (4:42)

Credits 
All melodies are arranged by Jørn Øien & Ernst-Wiggo Sandbakk
All melodies except 2, 10 & 11 are written down by Kaare Petersen in 1928
Recorded at Hønsehuset Lydstudio, Bodø, December 1994
Sound engineers Are B. Simonsen & Jøran Johnsen
Toppings made at Sigma Studio, Bergen, Lydmakeriet A/S, Tønsberg, and Nidaros Studio, Trondheim
Mastered by Rune Nordal
Studio recordings mixed at Nidaros Studio by Kjell Ove Grimsmo
Cover design by Astrid Lien
Cover photo by Merete Lien

References 

Oofotr albums
1995 albums